Helge Lien (born 23 April 1975) is a Norwegian jazz pianist, composer and band leader. He has in recent years also developed a passion for photography and digital processing of images and has passion for powerful melancholy, dynamics and detail.

Education
Lien attended Stange High School 1991 and earned his Examen artium in 1994, before taking up musical studies at Norwegian Academy of Music in Oslo. He got a Cand.mag. in 1998 under guidance of Mikhail Alperin, known as pianist of the Moscow Art Trio and from solo performances and recordings, and did postgraduate studies with the group Tri O'Trang culminating with cand.musicae exam in 2001.

Career
Lien is known from a variety of musical contexts, such as Tri O'Trang (with Torben Snekkestad on sax and Lars Andreas Haug on tuba), Helge Lien Trio, the duo Hero with saxophonist Rolf-Erik Nystrom, and with the vocalists Live Maria Roggen and Silje Nergaard.

The last decade Lien has given us a lot of evidence that a new Norwegian pianist of a very high caliber has entered the Jazz scene. We have encountered him in various constellations from solo piano, duos and as sideman, but it is first and foremost with Helge Lien Trio that he has moved up and out among the truly great. Here we can encounter, more than any other classic piano trio, the balance between jazz tradition and improvisation avantgardist excellent. With their seven albums and thrilling live performances they have already earned a large fan base, and when the Helge Lien Trio completed their first tour of Germany on the Berlin Jazz Club A-Trane in 2008, the album Hello Troll was the first Helge Lien Trio release for Ozella Music in Germany. This album was in many ways the ultimate breakthrough for Helge Lien Trio, although four previous releases on the Japanese DIW company had told us what Lien had to offer.

Lien, who has written all the music on the latest Helge Lien Trio album Natsukashii, is a melodic poet in temperament. In this classic trio format there are lots of references to trios with giants like Bill Evans and Keith Jarrett but even more obvious are the links to the Brad Mehldau trio, which set a new standard for jazz trio for the new 2000 millennium. Along with bassist Frode Berg and drummer Knut Aalefjær, who was substituted with Per Oddvar Johansen from 2013, Lien has taken new steps over again and it is up to that category Helge Lien Trio is also moving.

Honors
2002: Norwegian Government Grants
2007: Nattjazzprisen
2008: Spellemannprisen in the class Jazz
2008: Kongsberg Jazz Award

Discography

As leader/co-leader

Collaborations 

With LiveLien
2011: Låvesalg (Jazzland/Universal)
2016: YOU (Ozella)

With Arild Andersen and Gard Nilssen
2016: The Rose Window (Deutsche Media Productions), live at Theater Gütersloh

References

External links
 Helge Lien Biography – Store Norske Leksikon
 

20th-century Norwegian pianists
21st-century Norwegian pianists
Norwegian jazz pianists
Norwegian jazz composers
Male jazz composers
Spellemannprisen winners
Grappa Music artists
People from Ringsaker
Living people
1975 births
Norwegian male pianists
20th-century Norwegian male musicians
21st-century Norwegian male musicians
Helge Lien Trio members
Edition Records artists